American Me is a 1992 American independent crime drama film produced and directed by Edward James Olmos, his first film as a director, and written by Floyd Mutrux and Desmond Nakano. Olmos also stars as the film's protagonist, Montoya Santana, loosely based on mob boss Rodolfo Cadena. Executive producers included record producer Lou Adler, screenwriter Mutrux, and Irwin Young. It depicts a fictionalized account of the founding and rise to power of the Mexican Mafia in the California prison system from the 1950s into the 1980s.

Plot
The film depicts 30 years of Chicano gang life in Los Angeles. The story opens up with the Zoot Suit Riots of 1943, depicting a young Latino couple Esperanza and Pedro Santana being racially targeted by sailors. Pedro is taken out to the streets and beaten alongside other Latin-Americans having their clothing ripped and torn, while Esperanza is gang raped by the sailors. The story transitions to years later in 1959 and focuses on the Santana family's eldest son Montoya, a teen who forms a gang along with his friends J.D. and Mundo. They soon find themselves committing crimes and are arrested.

In juvenile hall, Santana murders a fellow inmate who had raped him, and as a result has his sentence extended into Folsom State Prison after he turns 18.

Years later, Santana has becomes the leader of a powerful prison gang, La Eme. Upon his release in 1977, he tries to relate his life experiences to the society that has changed so much since he left. La Eme has become a feared criminal organization beyond Folsom, selling drugs and committing murder. Santana begins a romantic relationship with a woman named Julie, but she becomes repulsed by his violent tendencies and La Eme's negative influence on their community. This becomes evident when a drug lord (who refused to give control of distribution to La Eme) retaliates against them when they take things too far, and have “Puppet” (assisted by other members) brutally rape and murder his son in prison to send a message. The drug lord targets Santana's community by distributing pure heroin to local users which leads to mass overdoses, including Julie's young brother. Santana visits his mother's grave, where Pedro reveals he always resented him because he might have been the result of the rape of his mother, thereby serving as a constant reminder of his mother's ordeal.

Santana starts to see the error of his ways, but before he can take action he is sent back to Folsom for drug possession. When J.D. visits, Santana tells him that he is no longer interested in leading La Eme. However, following a precedent set by Santana himself earlier in the film, his men, including Mundo, murder him to show the other prison gangs that despite having no leader La Eme is not weak, and will not tolerate anyone leaving the gang. He is fatally stabbed and thrown off the balcony to his death. Elsewhere Puppet is released from prison and picked up by his little brother and fellow gang member “Little Puppet”. As they make a stop to urinate, Little Puppet mentions he has a baby on the way, but as he tells his older brother, Puppet then reluctantly strangles him to death, having been ordered to since Little Puppet was openly disrespectful towards La Eme following his own release from prison earlier.

Julie receives a letter from Santana thanking her for opening his eyes and his necklace of St. Dismas. Julie gives the necklace to Santana's teen brother Paulito, who then inducts a young boy into La Eme by having them commit a drive-by shooting.

Cast
 Edward James Olmos as Montoya Santana, based on Rudy "Cheyenne" Cadena, a notorious La Eme mob boss. Cheyenne died in 1972 after being stabbed and bludgeoned to death by members of the Mexican Mafia's long-standing bitter rival, the Nuestra Familia.
Panchito Gomez as Young Montoya Santana
 William Forsythe as J.D, based on Joe "Pegleg" Morgan. Joseph Morgan was a Croatian-American man who became a member of the Mexican Mafia in 1968 while doing time in San Quentin State prison, despite his lack of Mexican or other Latino heritage. He died in prison in 1993 from inoperable liver cancer.
Steve Wilcox as Young J.D.
 Pepe Serna as "Mundo", based on Ramon "Mundo" Mendoza. According to 'Mundo', he was not a founding member of La eMe and he didn't become a member shortly after his arrival to San Quentin State prison in 1968. He stated that he had not murdered 'Cheyenne' Cadena, after he saw the film's depiction.
Richard Coca as Young "Mundo"
 Daniel A. Haro as "Huero". Based on Luis "Huero Buff" Flores, who was the founder of the Mexican Mafia while doing time for murder in 1957 at the Deuel Vocational Institution.
 Sal Lopez as Pedro Santana
 Vira Montes as Esperanza Santana
 Danny De La Paz as "Puppet"
 Daniel Villarreal as "Little Puppet"
 Evelina Fernández as Julie
 Roberto Martín Márquez as Acha
 Dyana Ortelli as Yolanda
 Jacob Vargas as Paulito Santana
 Eric Close as Juvie Hall Attacker
 Rigoberto Jimenez as "Big Happy"
 Cary-Hiroyuki Tagawa as "El Japo" based on Mike "Jap Mike" Kudo.
 Robby Robinson as Drug Thief
 Ron Thompson as Junkie
 Rafael H. Robledo as "El Chucko" Pena
 William Smith as Deacon

Production 
Parts of the film were shot in Folsom State Prison and California Institution for Men.  Shooting lasted for three weeks and included 800 inmates and guards, who appeared as extras.  Scenes shot in Los Angeles included gang members as extras.

Reception

Critical response
Roger Ebert of the Chicago Sun-Times liked the reality that came through in the film and that it rang true: "What I felt watching American Me, however, is that it is based on a true situation—on the reality that street gangs and prison, mixed with the drug sales that finance the process, work together to create a professional criminal class."

Janet Maslin writes in The New York Times, "But Mr. Olmos's direction...is dark, slow and solemn, so much so that it diverts energy from the film's fundamental frankness. Violent as it is, American Me is seldom dramatic enough to bring its material to life."

Marjorie Baumgarten, a film critic for The Austin Chronicle, wrote, "American Me is crafted with heart and conviction and intelligence. It demands no less of its audience. It insists that there are no quick fixes, but that solutions are of the utmost urgency."

The film was screened in the Un Certain Regard section at the 1992 Cannes Film Festival.

On Rotten Tomatoes the film has an approval rating of 73% based on reviews from 11 critics. On Metacritic the film has a score of 66% based on reviews from 11 critics, indicating "generally favorable reviews".

Box office
The film opened in wide release in the United States on March 13, 1992 (830 screens).  The opening weekend's gross was $3.4 million, and the total receipts for the first three weeks were $9.1 million. The film was in wide release for three weeks (seventeen days). In its widest release the film was featured in 830 theaters across the country. The final box office gross amounted to $13.1 million.

Mexican Mafia reaction
Segments of the Mexican Mafia were enraged by the film, specifically the lead character's rape as a juvenile and his death at the hands of his own followers at the end of his criminal career. Whether as retaliation over their depiction in the film, or as a routine criminal racket, Mexican Mafia member Joe "Pegleg" Morgan, who served as the inspiration for the character of J.D., allegedly attempted to extort money from Olmos. Court documents show that Olmos was a victim in one extortion count contained in a 33-count federal indictment. According to reportage by CBS News weekly 60 Minutes, three consultants on this film were later murdered because of the depiction of a homosexual rape scene which offended the Mexican Mafia gangsters' machismo.

Actor Danny Trejo said in an interview that he was aware of 10 people having been murdered for their involvement with the film. The first killing occurred 12 days after the film's premiere when one of the film's consultants, Charles "Charlie Brown" Manriquez, a member of La Eme, was killed in Ramona Gardens, L.A.'s oldest public housing project.

Another consultant to the film, 49-year-old grandmother Ana Lizarraga, commonly known as "The Gang Lady", was murdered when she was gunned down in her East Los Angeles driveway while loading luggage into her car the day of her mothers funeral. A federal indictment accused La Eme of ordering the 1992 murder of Lizarraga. Lizarraga was a former gang member who was, by the time she was killed, an anti-gang counselor. She played a grandmother in the film. Her murder occurred eight months after American Me was completed.

Soundtrack
Since the film deals with a Latino subculture, the music included in the soundtrack was Latino oriented—late 1970s urban sounds and oldies from the 1950s.

The original soundtrack was released on April 28, 1992, by Virgin Records.

The CD contains ten tracks and includes songs performed by various artists including: Los Lobos, Santana, Ike & Tina Turner, Bobby Day, Kid Frost, War, and other performers.

References

External links

 
 
 

1992 films
1990s biographical drama films
1992 crime drama films
American biographical drama films
American crime drama films
Films directed by Edward James Olmos
Films set in California
Films set in the 1940s
Films set in the 1950s
Films set in the 1960s
Films set in the 1970s
Films set in the 1980s
Films shot in Los Angeles
Films shot in San Francisco
Films about Mexican Americans
Mexican Mafia
Social realism in film
Universal Pictures films
American prison drama films
Hispanic and Latino American drama films
1992 directorial debut films
1990s English-language films
Films with screenplays by Floyd Mutrux
Spanish-language American films
1990s American films
1992 independent films